KWNG (105.9 FM) is a classic hits radio station in Red Wing, Minnesota, and is owned by Q Media Group, LLC.
They are also the local affiliate station in the Red Wing area for the MLB's Minnesota Twins for all 162 regular season & playoff games.

References

External links
KWNG website 

Radio stations in Minnesota
Radio stations established in 1965
1965 establishments in Minnesota
Red Wing, Minnesota